Santa Cruz del Norte Municipal Museum is a museum located in 11th avenue in Santa Cruz del Norte, Cuba. It was established on 28 January 1982.

The museum holds collections on history, weaponry, archeology and ethnology.

See also 
 List of museums in Cuba

References 

Museums in Cuba
Buildings and structures in Mayabeque Province
Museums established in 1982
1982 establishments in Cuba
20th-century architecture in Cuba